Thomas Wade Landry (September 11, 1924 – February 12, 2000) was an American professional football player and coach. Regarded as one of the greatest head coaches of all time, he was the first head coach of the Dallas Cowboys in the National Football League (NFL), a position he held for 29 seasons. During his coaching career, he created many new formations and methods, such as the now popular 4–3 defense, and the "flex defense" system made famous by the "Doomsday Defense" squads he built during his tenure with the Cowboys. His 29 consecutive years from 1960 to 1988 as the coach of one team is an NFL record, along with his 20 consecutive winning seasons, which is considered to be his most impressive professional accomplishment.

In addition to his record 20 consecutive winning seasons from 1966 to 1985, Landry won two Super Bowl titles (in Super Bowl VI and XII), five NFC titles, and 13 divisional titles. He compiled a 270–178–6 record, the fourth-most wins all-time for an NFL coach, and his 20 career playoff victories are the second most of any coach in NFL history. Landry was also named the NFL Coach of the Year in 1966 and the NFC Coach of the Year in 1975.

From 1966 to 1982, a span of 17 years, Dallas played in 12 NFL or NFC Championship games. Furthermore, the Cowboys appeared in 10 NFC Championship games in the 13-year span from 1970 to 1982. Leading the Cowboys to three Super Bowl appearances in four years between 1975 and 1978, and five in nine years between 1970 and 1978, along with being on television more than any other NFL team, resulted in the Cowboys receiving the label of "America's Team", a title Landry did not appreciate because he felt it would bring on extra motivation from the rest of the league to compete with the Cowboys. He was inducted into the Pro Football Hall of Fame in 1990.

Early life 
Born in Mission, Texas, to Ray (an auto mechanic and volunteer fireman) and Ruth (Coffman) Landry, Tom was the second of four children (Robert, Tom, Ruthie, and Jack). Landry's father had suffered from rheumatism, and relocated to the warmer climate of Texas from Illinois. Ray Landry was an athlete, making his mark locally as a pitcher and football player. Tom played quarterback and punter for Mission High School, where he led his team to a 12–0 record in his senior season. The Mission High School football stadium is named Tom Landry Stadium and is home to the Mission Eagles and Mission Patriots which also bears the Pro Football Hall of Fame logo.

Landry attended the University of Texas at Austin as an industrial engineering major. Landry had given thought to enrolling at Mississippi State University, where his friend John Tripson was an All-American, but did not want to be far away from his friends and family in Texas. The main driving force in keeping him from enrolling at Mississippi State University was the notion that it would be too long a travel for his parents to see him play college football.

He interrupted his education after a semester to serve in the United States Army Air Corps during World War II. Landry was inspired to join the armed forces in honor of his brother Robert Landry, who had enlisted in the Army Air Corps after the attack on Pearl Harbor. While ferrying a B-17 over to England, Robert Landry's plane had gone down over the North Atlantic, close to Iceland. Several weeks passed before the Army was able to officially declare Robert Landry dead. Tom Landry began his basic training at Sheppard Field near Wichita Falls, Texas (now Sheppard AFB), and his preflight training at Kelly Field (now Kelly Field), located near San Antonio, Texas. Landry's first experience as a bomber was a tough one. A few minutes after takeoff, Landry noticed that the pilot seemed to be working furiously, causing him to realize that the plane's engine had died. Despite this experience, Landry was committed to flying. At the age of 19, Landry was transferred to Sioux City, Iowa, where he trained as a copilot for flying a B-17. In 1944, Landry got his orders, and from Sioux City he went to Liverpool, England, where he was assigned to the Eighth Air Force, 493rd Squadron in Ipswich. Landry earned his wings and a commission as a Second Lieutenant at Lubbock Army Air Field, and was assigned to the 493d Bombardment Group at RAF Debach, England, as a B-17 Flying Fortress bomber copilot in the 860th Bombardment Squadron. From November 1944 to April 1945, he completed a combat tour of 30 missions, and survived a crash landing in Belgium after his bomber ran out of fuel.

He returned to his studies at the University of Texas in the fall of 1946. On the football team, he played fullback and defensive back on the Texas Longhorns' bowl game winners on New Year's Day of 1948 and 1949. At UT, he was a member of the Texas Cowboys and Delta Kappa Epsilon fraternity (Omega Chi chapter). He received his bachelor's degree from UT in 1949. In 1952, he earned a master's degree in industrial engineering from the University of Houston.

Playing career 
Landry was selected in the 19th round (128th overall) of the 1948 AAFC Draft. He played one season in the All-America Football Conference for the New York Yankees, then moved in 1950 across town to the New York Giants.

Landry was also selected by the New York Giants in the 20th round (184th overall) of the 1947 NFL Draft.

After the 1949 season, the AAFC folded, and the Yankees were not among the teams absorbed by the NFL. The New York Giants exercised their territorial rights and selected Landry in a dispersal draft. Under the guidance of Giants head coach Steve Owen, Landry got his first taste of coaching. Instead of explaining the 6–1–4 defense to the players, Owen called Landry up to the front, and asked him to explain the defense to his teammates. Landry got up, and explained what the defense would do to counter the offense, and this became Landry's first coaching experience. The 1953 season would be a season to forget, with the lowest point coming in a 62–10 loss at the hands of the Cleveland Browns. This loss would ultimately cost Coach Owen his job, and would again have Landry pondering his future. In 1954, he was selected as an All-Pro. He played through the 1955 season, and acted as a player-assistant coach the last two years, 1954 through 1955, under the guidance of new Giants head coach Jim Lee Howell. Landry ended his playing career with 32 interceptions in only 80 games, which he returned for 404 yards and three touchdowns.  He also recovered 10 fumbles (seven defensive), returning them for 67 yards and two touchdowns.

Career statistics 

Special teams

Coaching career 
For the 1954 football season, Landry became the defensive coordinator for the Giants, opposite Vince Lombardi, who was the offensive coordinator. Landry led one of the best defensive teams in the league from 1956 to 1959. The two coaches created a fanatical loyalty within the unit they coached that drove the Giants to three appearances in the NFL championship game in four years. The Giants beat the Paddy Driscoll-led Chicago Bears 47–7 in 1956, but lost to the Baltimore Colts in 1958 and 1959.

In 1960, he became the first head coach of the Dallas Cowboys, a position he held for 29 seasons (1960–88). The Cowboys started with difficulties, recording an 0–11–1 record during their first season, with five or fewer wins in each of their next four. Despite this early futility, in 1964, Landry was given a 10-year extension by owner Clint Murchison Jr. It would prove to be a wise move, as Landry's hard work and determination paid off, and the Cowboys improved to a 7–7 record in 1965. In 1966, they surprised the NFL by posting 10 wins and making it all the way to the NFL Championship game. Dallas lost the game to Lombardi's Green Bay Packers, but this season was but a modest display of what lay ahead.

The Great Innovator 

Landry developed the now-popular "4–3 defense" while serving as Giants defensive coordinator. It was called "4–3" because it featured four down lineman (two ends and two defensive tackles on either side of the offensive center) and three linebackers – middle, left, and right. The innovation was the middle linebacker. Previously, a lineman was placed over the center. But Landry had this person stand up and move back two yards. The Giants' middle linebacker was the legendary Sam Huff.

When he came to Dallas, Landry refined the 4–3 even further, specifically to counter Lombardi's "run to daylight" strategy. Lombardi's offense was built around sending the running back through any open space, rather than a specific assigned hole. Landry reasoned that the best counter was a defense that blotted out the daylight. The result was the "Flex Defense," which assigned the defenders specific areas of the field to cover. When Landry first implemented it in 1964, fans were initially mystified when they saw the Cowboys defense not swarming to the ball. However, the skeptics were won over when ball carriers invariably ran right into the arms of one of Landry's defenders. The Flex Defense worked so well that Landry had to create an offense to score on it, one which disguised an otherwise simple play with multiple formations.

Landry did not always search inside the traditional college football pipeline for talent. For example, he recruited several soccer players from Latin America, such as Efren Herrera and Rafael Septién, to compete for the job of placekicker for the Cowboys. Landry looked to the world of track and field for speedy skill-position players. For example, Bob Hayes, once considered the fastest man in the world, was drafted by and played wide receiver for the Cowboys under Landry.

Landry produced a very large coaching tree. In 1986, five NFL head coaches were former Landry assistants: Mike Ditka, Dan Reeves, John Mackovic, Gene Stallings, and Raymond Berry.

Coaching in the Super Bowl 

While Tom Landry's Cowboys are known for their two Super Bowls against Chuck Noll and the Pittsburgh Steelers, Landry also led Dallas to three other Super Bowls, and they were a Bart Starr quarterback sneak away from representing the NFL in the second Super Bowl. Tom Landry was 2–3 in Super Bowls, winning both in New Orleans and losing all three at Miami's Orange Bowl Stadium.

Landry coached the Cowboys to their first Super Bowl win, defeating the Miami Dolphins 24–3, holding the Dolphins to a single field goal. The Cowboys won their first Super Bowl a year after losing to the Baltimore Colts. The Cowboys lost the first battle with the Steelers, in a game that is heralded as a classic. The rematch would be just as good, with the Cowboys being a Jackie Smith catch away from tying the Steelers and keeping pace early in the third quarter; instead, Pittsburgh scored twice in succession and put the game away. Before the Super Bowl XIII rematch, Cowboys linebacker Thomas "Hollywood" Henderson famously stated, "Terry Bradshaw couldn't spell c-a-t if you spotted him the C and the T." Landry recalled in his autobiography how he cringed when he heard that, because he did not feel that Bradshaw needed additional motivation in a big game like the Super Bowl.

Dismissal and legacy 
In the 1980s, the Cowboys won two Division Championships, and made five playoff appearances which included reaching the NFC Championship Game in three consecutive seasons (1980–1982), but failed to reach the Super Bowl. The last of those games came in the 1982 season, when the Cowboys lost to the Washington Redskins. Landry would never make the NFC Championship game again, nor win another playoff game.

In 1984, Dallas businessman Bum Bright bought the team from Murchison. As the Cowboys suffered through progressively poorer seasons (from 10–6 in 1985 to 7–9 in 1986, 7–8 in 1987, and 3–13 in 1988), Bright became disenchanted with the team. Landry's game strategies and single-mindedness during these few seasons left him open to public criticism.

Landry had signed a three-year contract in the summer of 1987. However, general manager Tex Schramm brought in Paul Hackett as the new offensive coach in 1986, and in 1987, he hired offensive line coach Jim Erkenbeck and special-teams coach Mike Solari. Some suggested that Schramm's moves divided the coaching staff, a plan to first undermine and then dismiss Landry. Bright, who usually stayed behind the scenes, publicly criticized Landry after an embarrassing home loss to the Atlanta Falcons in 1987, saying that he was "horrified" at the play-calling and complaining, "It doesn't seem like we've got anybody in charge who knows what he's doing, other than Tex." Bright was also upset at how top draft pick, defensive tackle Danny Noonan, and running back Herschel Walker were not being used enough. Two weeks later, one day after the Cowboys' 27–17 loss to the Detroit Lions, a team that had come into the game tied with the Chiefs, Giants, and Rams for the worst record in the NFL, Schramm said on his radio show, "There's an old saying, 'If the teacher doesn't teach, the student doesn't learn'." Nonetheless, Bright maintained his hands-off approach on the team while Schramm retained his confidence in Landry.

Landry's Cowboys finished the 1988 season 3–13, which earned them the no. 1 pick in the draft with the worst record in the NFL, taking his personal record to 270–178–6. It was the fourth time in five years that they missed the playoffs, as well as their third consecutive losing season. Nonetheless, Landry felt confident he could correct the mistakes he had been making in recent years. In February 1989, before the start of the 1989 season, he remained determined to coach into the 1990s "unless I get fired," as he dismissed or reassigned his assistants. Landry had one year left on his contract which paid $1 million a season.

Meanwhile, Bright had suffered major losses in his banking, real estate, and oil businesses in the last three years; during the savings and loan crisis, Bright's Savings and Loan was taken over by the FSLIC. With most of the rest of his fortune tied up in the Cowboys, Bright was forced to put the Cowboys up for sale. In a better economic climate, Bright may have been able to hold on to the team, and Landry may have remained as coach. However, in 1990, Bright said he wanted to fire Landry himself as early as 1987, but Schramm told him that there was not a replacement ready to take over yet. Bright ultimately sold the team to Jerry Jones. One day after Jones closed on the purchase, he fired Landry. Jones hired Jimmy Johnson, his former teammate at the University of Arkansas, who had been serving as head coach of the University of Miami football team. Schramm was in tears at the press conference which announced the coaching change, and he was forced out as general manager shortly afterwards; Schramm and Landry had been together for 29 years since the Cowboys' inception in 1960. When Landry met with his players two days later to tell them how much he would miss them, he began to cry, and the players responded with a standing ovation.

Landry received an outpouring of public support after his firing. The city of Dallas, along with Cowboys fans everywhere, forgot about the team's decline during the 1980s and instead recalled the memories of the legend in the fedora who built the Cowboys from nothing to champions. Jones stated he did not give consideration to retaining Landry for even a season, as he said he would not have purchased the team unless he could hire Johnson as coach. Jones also did not discuss the matter with Landry before announcing the decision. Landry's unceremonious dismissal by Jones was denounced by football fans and media as totally lacking in class and respect, as pride and tradition were part of the Cowboys where great performance and loyal service were expected to be rewarded. Since the dismissal, Jones has indicated he regrets the process of Landry's firing and his role in it.  In the years since, while most fans retain their support for the team, there persists significant levels of resentment towards Jones over the mistreatment of Landry.

By 1993, however, relations between Jones and Landry had improved, and Landry was inducted into the "Ring of Honor" at Texas Stadium.

Landry's last work in professional football was as a "limited partner" of the San Antonio Riders of the World League in 1992.

Head-coaching record

Coaching tree 
Dick Nolan, San Francisco 49ers (1968–75), New Orleans Saints (1978–80), San Antonio Force (1992)
Dan Reeves, Denver Broncos (1981–92), New York Giants (1993–96), Atlanta Falcons (1997–2003)
Mike Ditka, Chicago Bears (1982–92), New Orleans Saints (1997–99)
Raymond Berry, New England Patriots (1984–89)
John Mackovic, Kansas City Chiefs (1983–86), University of Illinois (1988–91), University of Texas (1992–97), University of Arizona (2001–03)
Ron Meyer, University of Nevada Las Vegas (1973–75), Southern Methodist University (1976–81), New England Patriots (1982–83), Indianapolis Colts (1986–91), Las Vegas Posse (1994), Chicago Enforcers (2001)
Gene Stallings, St. Louis/Phoenix Cardinals (1986–89), University of Alabama (1990–96)

Death 

Landry died on February 12, 2000, after battling leukemia. Landry's funeral service was held at Highland Park United Methodist Church, where he was an active and committed member for 43 years. He was interred in the Sparkman-Hillcrest Memorial Park Cemetery in Dallas. A cenotaph dedicated to Landry, complete with a depiction of his fedora, was placed in the official Texas State Cemetery in Austin at the family's request.

The Cowboys wore a patch on their uniforms during the 2000 season depicting Landry's trademark fedora. A bronze statue of Landry stood outside of Texas Stadium, and now stands in front of AT&T Stadium since the Cowboys relocated in 2009. The section of Interstate 30 between Dallas and Fort Worth was named the Tom Landry Highway by the Texas Legislature in 2001. The football stadium in Landry's hometown of Mission, Texas, was named Tom Landry Stadium to honor one of the city's most famous former residents. Similarly, Trinity Christian Academy's stadium in Addison, Texas, is named Tom Landry Stadium in honor of Landry's extensive involvement and support of the school. An elementary school in the Carrollton-Farmers Branch Independent School district, very near the Cowboys training facility in Valley Ranch, is also named in honor of Landry. The Tom Landry Welcome Center at Dallas Baptist University, where he was a frequent chapel speaker and award recipient, was posthumously dedicated to him in 2002.

In 2013, a major new biography of Landry was published, entitled The Last Cowboy.

In popular culture 
 On December 24, 1959, while defensive coach of the Giants, Landry pretended to be Catholic missionary Father William A. Lightning on the panel game To Tell The Truth.
 The machiavellian coach in Peter Gent's novel North Dallas Forty is based on Tom Landry.  G.D. Spradlin played the role in the film of the same name. 
 In the animated sitcom King of the Hill, the middle school in Arlen is named "Tom Landry Middle School", and Landry is a personal hero of the show's main character Hank Hill. He mentions being "mortified" because he went to work on the date of Landry's death after his cousin Dusty (guest star Dusty Hill of ZZ Top) had previously tricked him into thinking Tom Landry had died, and he thought it was a repeat of that prank. Hank also has a Tom Landry ceramic plate that he sometimes consults in times of need, on one occasion saying, "Where did I go wrong, Tom?" Landry also occasionally appears to Hank in dream sequences to counsel him in times of need, such as during Hank's varnish-induced hallucination in the episode "Hillennium" and in "Trans-Fascism", when he tells Hank the consequences of breaking the law.
 In an episode of The Simpsons ("You Only Move Twice"), Homer Simpson buys Tom Landry's trademark fedora in an effort to improve his leadership qualities, and is shown in several later episodes wearing the hat. Landry is also featured in the season 7 episode "Marge Be Not Proud" as one of the Christmas carolers introduced by Krusty the Clown early in the episode.
 In a Campbell's Chunky Soup commercial, the game takes place in a fictional Reginald H. White Memorial Park, on the corner of Landry Road and Halas Drive.

Awards and honors 
 1966: National Football League Coach of the Year Award
 1978: Recipient of the Golden Plate Award of the American Academy of Achievement
 1989: Honored by the city of Dallas
 1990: Inducted into Pro Football Hall of Fame
 1993: Inducted into Dallas Cowboys' Ring of Honor

Personal life 
Landry married Alicia Wiggs on January 28, 1949. They had a son and two daughters. He was a Christian. On January 22, 2021, the Dallas Cowboys announced that Alicia had died the previous day at the age of 91.

When coaching on the sidelines Landry always wore a suit and tie with his trademark fedora.

See also 
 List of National Football League head coaches with 50 wins
 List of professional gridiron football coaches with 200 wins

References

Bibliography 
 Cavanaugh, Jack (2008). Giants Among Men. New York: Random House. .

Further reading 
 Summerall, Pat, and Michael Levin (2010). Giants: What I Learned About Life from Vince Lombardi and Tom Landry. Hoboken, New Jersey: John Wiley and Sons. .

External links 
 
 

1924 births
2000 deaths
20th-century Methodists
21st-century Methodists
American football cornerbacks
American football halfbacks
American football quarterbacks
American United Methodists
Burials at Sparkman-Hillcrest Memorial Park Cemetery
Dallas Cowboys head coaches
Deaths from cancer in Texas
Deaths from leukemia
Eastern Conference Pro Bowl players
National Football League announcers
National Football League defensive coordinators
New York Giants coaches
New York Giants players
New York Yankees (AAFC) players
People from Mission, Texas
Players of American football from Dallas
Pro Football Hall of Fame inductees
Super Bowl-winning head coaches
Texas Longhorns football players
United States Army Air Forces officers
United States Army Air Forces pilots of World War II
University of Houston alumni